Charlotte Brontë (commonly ; 21 April 1816 – 31 March 1855) was an English novelist and poet, the eldest of the three Brontë sisters who survived into adulthood and whose novels became classics of English literature.

She enlisted in school at Roe Head, Mirfield, in January 1831, aged 14 years. She left the year after to teach her sisters, Emily and Anne, at home, returning in 1835 as a governess. In 1839, she undertook the role of governess for the Sidgwick family, but left after a few months to return to Haworth, where the sisters opened a school but failed to attract pupils. Instead, they turned to writing and they each first published in 1846 under the pseudonyms of Currer, Ellis, and Acton Bell. Although her first novel, The Professor, was rejected by publishers, her second novel, Jane Eyre, was published in 1847. The sisters admitted to their Bell pseudonyms in 1848, and by the following year were celebrated in London literary circles.

Charlotte Brontë was the last to die of all her siblings. She became pregnant shortly after her marriage in June 1854 but died on 31 March 1855, almost certainly from hyperemesis gravidarum, a complication of pregnancy which causes excessive nausea and vomiting.

Early years and education
Charlotte Brontë was born on 21 April 1816 in Market Street, Thornton, west of Bradford in the West Riding of Yorkshire, the third of the six children of Maria (née Branwell) and Patrick Brontë (formerly surnamed Brunty), an Irish Anglican clergyman. In 1820 her family moved a few miles to the village of Haworth, on the edge of the moors, where her father had been appointed perpetual curate of St Michael and All Angels Church. Maria died of cancer on 15 September 1821, leaving five daughters, Maria, Elizabeth, Charlotte, Emily and Anne, and a son, Branwell, to be taken care of by her sister, Elizabeth Branwell.

In August 1824, Patrick sent Charlotte, Emily, Maria, and Elizabeth to the Clergy Daughters' School at Cowan Bridge in Lancashire. Charlotte maintained that the school's poor conditions permanently affected her health and physical development, and hastened the deaths of Maria (born 1814) and Elizabeth (born 1815), who both died of tuberculosis in June 1825. After the deaths of his older daughters, Patrick removed Charlotte and Emily from the school. Charlotte used the school as the basis for Lowood School in Jane Eyre, which is similarly affected by tuberculosis that is exacerbated by the poor conditions.

At home in Haworth Parsonage, Brontë acted as "the motherly friend and guardian of her younger sisters". Brontë wrote her first known poem at the age of 13 in 1829, and was to go on to write more than 200 poems in the course of her life. Many of her poems were "published" in their homemade magazine Branwell's Blackwood's Magazine, and concerned the fictional world of Glass Town. She and her surviving siblings – Branwell, Emily and Anne – created this shared  world, and began chronicling the lives and struggles of the inhabitants of their imaginary kingdom in 1827. Charlotte, in private letters, called Glass Town "her 'world below', a private escape where she could act out her desires and multiple identities". Charlotte's "predilection for romantic settings, passionate relationships, and high society is at odds with Branwell's obsession with battles and politics and her young sisters' homely North Country realism, none the less at this stage there is still a sense of the writings as a family enterprise".

However, from 1831 onwards, Emily and Anne 'seceded' from the Glass Town Confederacy to create a 'spin-off' called Gondal, which included many of their poems. After 1831, Charlotte and Branwell concentrated on an evolution of the Glass Town Confederacy called Angria. Christine Alexander, a Brontë juvenilia historian, wrote "both Charlotte and Branwell ensured the consistency of their imaginary world. When Branwell exuberantly kills off important characters in his manuscripts, Charlotte comes to the rescue and, in effect, resurrects them for the next stories [...]; and when Branwell becomes bored with his inventions, such as the Glass Town magazine he edits, Charlotte takes over his initiative and keeps the publication going for several more years". The sagas the siblings created were episodic and elaborate, and they exist in incomplete manuscripts, some of which have been published as juvenilia. They provided them with an obsessive interest during childhood and early adolescence, which prepared them for literary vocations in adulthood.

Between 1831 and 1832, Brontë continued her education at a boarding school twenty miles away in Mirfield, Roe Head (now part of Hollybank Special School), where she met her lifelong friends and correspondents Ellen Nussey and Mary Taylor. In 1833 she wrote a novella, The Green Dwarf, using the name Wellesley. Around about 1833, her stories shifted from tales of the supernatural to more realistic stories. She returned to Roe Head as a teacher from 1835 to 1838. Unhappy and lonely as a teacher at Roe Head, Brontë took out her sorrows in poetry, writing a series of melancholic poems. In "We wove a Web in Childhood" written in December 1835, Brontë drew a sharp contrast between her miserable life as a teacher and the vivid imaginary worlds she and her siblings had created. In another poem "Morning was its freshness still" written at the same time, Brontë wrote "Tis bitter sometimes to recall/Illusions once deemed fair". Many of her poems concerned the imaginary world of Angria, often concerning Byronic heroes, and in December 1836 she wrote to the Poet Laureate Robert Southey asking him for encouragement of her career as a poet. Southey replied, famously, that "Literature cannot be the business of a woman's life, and it ought not to be. The more she is engaged in her proper duties, the less leisure will she have for it even as an accomplishment and a recreation." This advice she respected but did not heed.

In 1839, she took up the first of many positions as governess to families in Yorkshire, a career she pursued until 1841. In particular, from May to July 1839 she was employed by the Sidgwick family at their summer residence, Stone Gappe, in Lothersdale, where one of her charges was John Benson Sidgwick (1835–1927), an unruly child who on one occasion threw the Bible at Charlotte, an incident that may have been the inspiration for a part of the opening chapter of Jane Eyre in which John Reed throws a book at the young Jane. Brontë did not enjoy her work as a governess, noting her employers treated her almost as a slave, constantly humiliating her.

Brontë was of slight build and was less than five feet tall.

Brussels and Haworth

In 1842 Charlotte and Emily travelled to Brussels to enrol at the boarding school run by Constantin Héger (1809–1896) and his wife Claire Zoé Parent Héger (1804–1887). During her time in Brussels, Brontë, who favoured the Protestant ideal of an individual in direct contact with God, objected to the stern Catholicism of Madame Héger, which she considered a tyrannical religion that enforced conformity and submission to the Pope. In return for board and tuition Charlotte taught English and Emily taught music. Their time at the school was cut short when their aunt Elizabeth Branwell, who had joined the family in Haworth to look after the children after their mother's death, died of internal obstruction in October 1842. Charlotte returned alone to Brussels in January 1843 to take up a teaching post at the school. Her second stay was not happy: she was homesick and deeply attached to Constantin Héger. She returned to Haworth in January 1844 and used the time spent in Brussels as the inspiration for some of the events in The Professor and Villette.

After returning to Haworth, Charlotte and her sisters made headway with opening their own boarding school in the family home. It was advertised as "The Misses Brontë's Establishment for the Board and Education of a limited number of Young Ladies" and inquiries were made to prospective pupils and sources of funding. But none were attracted and in October 1844, the project was abandoned.

First publication
In May 1846 Charlotte, Emily, and Anne self-financed the publication of a joint collection of poems under their assumed names Currer, Ellis and Acton Bell. The pseudonyms veiled the sisters' sex while preserving their initials; thus Charlotte was Currer Bell. "Bell" was the middle name of Haworth's curate, Arthur Bell Nicholls whom Charlotte later married, and "Currer" was the surname of Frances Mary Richardson Currer who had funded their school (and maybe their father). Of the decision to use noms de plume, Charlotte wrote:

Although only two copies of the collection of poems were sold, the sisters continued writing for publication and began their first novels, continuing to use their noms de plume when sending manuscripts to potential publishers.

The Professor and Jane Eyre

Brontë's first manuscript, 'The Professor', did not secure a publisher, although she was heartened by an encouraging response from Smith, Elder & Co. of Cornhill, who expressed an interest in any longer works Currer Bell might wish to send. Brontë responded by finishing and sending a second manuscript in August 1847. Six weeks later, Jane Eyre was published. It tells the story of a plain governess, Jane, who, after difficulties in her early life, falls in love with her employer, Mr Rochester. They marry, but only after Rochester's insane first wife, of whom Jane initially has no knowledge, dies in a dramatic house fire. The book's style was innovative, combining Romanticism, naturalism with gothic melodrama, and broke new ground in being written from an intensely evoked first-person female perspective. Brontë believed art was most convincing when based on personal experience; in Jane Eyre she transformed the experience into a novel with universal appeal.

Jane Eyre had immediate commercial success and initially received favourable reviews. G. H. Lewes wrote that it was "an utterance from the depths of a struggling, suffering, much-enduring spirit", and declared that it consisted of "suspiria de profundis!" (sighs from the depths). Speculation about the identity and gender of the mysterious Currer Bell heightened with the publication of Wuthering Heights by Ellis Bell (Emily) and Agnes Grey by Acton Bell (Anne). Accompanying the speculation was a change in the critical reaction to Brontë's work, as accusations were made that the writing was "coarse", a judgement more readily made once it was suspected that Currer Bell was a woman. However, sales of Jane Eyre continued to be strong and may even have increased as a result of the novel developing a reputation as an "improper" book. A talented amateur artist, Brontë personally did the drawings for the second edition of Jane Eyre and in the summer of 1834 two of her paintings were shown at an exhibition by the Royal Northern Society for the Encouragement of the Fine Arts in Leeds.

Shirley and bereavements
In 1848 Brontë began work on the manuscript of her second novel, Shirley. It was only partially completed when the Brontë family suffered the deaths of three of its members within eight months. In September 1848 Branwell died of chronic bronchitis and marasmus, exacerbated by heavy drinking, although Brontë believed that his death was due to tuberculosis. Branwell may have had a laudanum addiction. Emily became seriously ill shortly after his funeral and died of pulmonary tuberculosis in December 1848. Anne died of the same disease in May 1849. Brontë was unable to write at this time.

After Anne's death Brontë resumed writing as a way of dealing with her grief, and Shirley, which deals with themes of industrial unrest and the role of women in society, was published in October 1849. Unlike Jane Eyre, which is written in the first person, Shirley is written in the third person and lacks the emotional immediacy of her first novel, and reviewers found it less shocking.  Brontë, as her late sister's heir, suppressed the republication of Anne's second novel, The Tenant of Wildfell Hall, an action which had a deleterious effect on Anne's popularity as a novelist and has remained controversial among the sisters' biographers ever since.

In society
In view of the success of her novels, particularly Jane Eyre, Brontë was persuaded by her publisher to make occasional visits to London, where she revealed her true identity and began to move in more exalted social circles, becoming friends with  Elizabeth Gaskell and Harriet Martineau whose sister Rachel had taught Gaskell's daughters. Brontë sent an early copy of Shirley  to Martineau whose home  at Ambleside she   visited.  The two friends  shared an interest in racial relations and the abolitionist movement; recurrent themes in their writings.  Brontë was also  acquainted with William Makepeace Thackeray and G.H. Lewes. She never left Haworth for more than a few weeks at a time, as she did not want to leave her ageing father.  Thackeray's daughter, writer Anne Isabella Thackeray Ritchie, recalled a visit to her father by Brontë:

Brontë's friendship with Elizabeth Gaskell, while not particularly close, was significant in that Gaskell wrote the first biography of Brontë after her death in 1855.

Villette
Brontë's third novel, the last published in her lifetime, was Villette, which appeared in 1853. Its main themes include isolation, how such a condition can be borne, and the internal conflict brought about by social repression of individual desire. Its main character, Lucy Snowe, travels abroad to teach in a boarding school in the fictional town of Villette, where she encounters a culture and religion different from her own and falls in love with a man (Paul Emanuel) whom she cannot marry. Her experiences result in a breakdown but eventually, she achieves independence and fulfilment through running her own school. A substantial amount of the novel's dialogue is in the French language. Villette marked Brontë's return to writing from a first-person perspective (that of Lucy Snowe), the technique she had used in Jane Eyre. Another similarity to Jane Eyre lies in the use of aspects of her own life as inspiration for fictional events, in particular her reworking of the time she spent at the pensionnat in Brussels. Villette was acknowledged by critics of the day as a potent and sophisticated piece of writing although it was criticised for "coarseness" and for not being suitably "feminine" in its portrayal of Lucy's desires.

Marriage

Before the publication of Villette, Brontë received an expected proposal of marriage from Irishman Arthur Bell Nicholls, her father's curate, who had long been in love with her. She initially refused him and her father objected to the union at least partly because of Nicholls's poor financial status. Elizabeth Gaskell, who believed that marriage provided "clear and defined duties" that were beneficial for a woman, encouraged Brontë to consider the positive aspects of such a union and tried to use her contacts to engineer an improvement in Nicholls's finances. According to James Pope-Hennessy in The Flight of Youth, it was the generosity of Richard Monckton Milnes that made the marriage possible. Brontë meanwhile was increasingly attracted to Nicholls and by January 1854 she had accepted his proposal. They gained the approval of her father by April and married in June. Her father Patrick had intended to give Charlotte away, but at the last minute decided he could not, and Charlotte had to make her way to the church without him. The married couple took their honeymoon in Banagher, County Offaly, Ireland. By all accounts, her marriage was a success and Brontë found herself very happy in a way that was new to her.

Death
Brontë became pregnant soon after her wedding, but her health declined rapidly and, according to Gaskell, she was attacked by "sensations of perpetual nausea and ever-recurring faintness". She died, with her unborn child, on 31 March 1855, three weeks before her 39th birthday. Her death certificate gives the cause of death as phthisis, i.e. consumption (not tuberculosis, which was only one of many diseases included in this now outdated classification), but biographers including Claire Harman and others suggest that she died from dehydration and malnourishment due to vomiting caused by severe morning sickness or hyperemesis gravidarum. Brontë was buried in the family vault in the Church of St Michael and All Angels at Haworth.

The Professor, the first novel Brontë had written, was published posthumously in 1857. The fragment of a new novel she had been writing in her last years has been twice completed by recent authors, the more famous version being Emma Brown: A Novel from the Unfinished Manuscript by Charlotte Brontë by Clare Boylan in 2003. Most of her writings about the imaginary country Angria have also been published since her death. In 2018, The New York Times published a belated obituary for her.

Religion
The daughter of an Irish Anglican clergyman, Brontë was herself an Anglican. In a letter to her publisher, she claims to "love the Church of England. Her Ministers indeed, I do not regard as infallible personages, I have seen too much of them for that – but to the Establishment, with all her faults – the profane Athanasian Creed excluded – I am sincerely attached."

In a letter to Ellen Nussey she wrote:

The Life of Charlotte Brontë

Elizabeth Gaskell's biography The Life of Charlotte Brontë was published in 1857. It was an important step for a leading female novelist to write a biography of another, and Gaskell's approach was unusual in that, rather than analysing her subject's achievements, she concentrated on private details of Brontë's life, emphasising those aspects that countered the accusations of "coarseness" that had been levelled at her writing. The biography is frank in places, but omits details of Brontë's love for Héger, a married man, as being too much of an affront to contemporary morals and a likely source of distress to Brontë's father, widower, and friends. Mrs Gaskell also provided doubtful and inaccurate information about Patrick Brontë, claiming that he did not allow his children to eat meat. This is refuted by one of Emily Brontë's diary papers, in which she describes preparing meat and potatoes for dinner at the parsonage. It has been argued that Gaskell's approach transferred the focus of attention away from the 'difficult' novels, not just Brontë's, but all the sisters', and began a process of sanctification of their private lives.

Héger letters
On 29 July 1913 The Times of London printed four letters Brontë had written to Constantin Héger after leaving Brussels in 1844. Written in French except for one postscript in English, the letters broke the prevailing image of Brontë as an angelic martyr to Christian and female duties that had been constructed by many biographers, beginning with Gaskell. The letters, which formed part of a larger and somewhat one-sided correspondence in which Héger frequently appears not to have replied, reveal that she had been in love with a married man, although they are complex and have been interpreted in numerous ways, including as an example of literary self-dramatisation and an expression of gratitude from a former pupil.

In 1980 a commemorative plaque was unveiled at the Centre for Fine Arts, Brussels, on the site of the Madam Heger's school, in honour of Charlotte and Emily.

Publications

Juvenilia
 The Young Men's Magazine, Number 1 – 3 (August 1830)
 A Book of Ryhmes (1829)
 The Spell
 The Secret
 Lily Hart
 The Foundling
 Albion and Marina
 Tales of the Islanders
 Tales of Angria (written 1838–1839 – a collection of childhood and young adult writings including five short novels)
 Mina Laury
 Stancliffe's Hotel
 The Duke of Zamorna
 Henry Hastings
 Caroline Vernon
 The Roe Head Journal Fragments
Farewell to Angria

The Green Dwarf, A Tale of the Perfect Tense was written in 1833 under the pseudonym Lord Charles Albert Florian Wellesley. It shows the influence of Walter Scott, and Brontë's modifications to her earlier gothic style have led Christine Alexander to comment that, in the work, "it is clear that Brontë was becoming tired of the gothic mode per se".

"At the end of 1839, Brontë said goodbye to her fantasy world in a manuscript called Farewell to Angria. More and more, she was finding that she preferred to escape to her imagined worlds over remaining in reality – and she feared that she was going mad. So she said goodbye to her characters, scenes and subjects. [...] She wrote of the pain she felt at wrenching herself from her 'friends' and venturing into lands unknown".

Novels
 Jane Eyre, published in 1847
 Shirley, published in 1849
 Villette, published in 1853
 The Professor, written before Jane Eyre, was first submitted together with Wuthering Heights by Emily Brontë and Agnes Grey by Anne Brontë. Subsequently, The Professor was resubmitted separately, and rejected by many publishing houses. It was published posthumously in 1857
 Emma, unfinished; Brontë wrote only 20 pages of the manuscript, published posthumously in 1860. In recent decades at least two continuations of this fragment have appeared:
 Emma, by "Charlotte Brontë and Another Lady", published 1980; although this has been attributed to Elizabeth Goudge, the actual author was Constance Savery.
 Emma Brown, by Clare Boylan, published 2003

Poetry

 Selected Poems of the Brontës, Everyman Poetry (1997)

Notes

References

Sources

Further reading

 The Letters of Charlotte Brontë, 3 volumes edited by Margaret Smith, 2007
 The Life of Charlotte Brontë, Elizabeth Gaskell, 1857
 Charlotte Brontë, Winifred Gérin
 Charlotte Brontë: a passionate life, Lyndal Gordon
 The Literary Protégées of the Lake Poets, Dennis Low (Chapter 1 contains a revisionist contextualisation of Robert Southey's infamous letter to Charlotte Brontë)
 Charlotte Brontë: Unquiet Soul, Margot Peters
 In the Footsteps of the Brontës, Ellis Chadwick
 The Brontës, Juliet Barker
 Charlotte Brontë and her Dearest Nell, Barbara Whitehead
 The Brontë Myth, Lucasta Miller
 A Life in Letters, selected by Juliet Barker
 Charlotte Brontë and Defensive Conduct: The Author and the Body at Risk, Janet Gezari, University of Pennsylvania Press, 1992
 Charlotte Brontë: Truculent Spirit, by Valerie Grosvenor Myer, 1987
 Charlotte Brontë and her Family, Rebecca Fraser
 The Oxford Reader's Companion to the Brontës, Christine Alexander & Margaret Smith
 Charlotte & Arthur, Pauline Clooney (2021) . Reimagining Charlotte Brontë's honeymoon in Ireland & Wales.
A Brontë Family Chronology, Edward Chitham
 The Crimes of Charlotte Brontë, James Tully, 1999
 A book about Brontë through the eyes of a working-class woman
 Fictionalised account of Arthur Bells Nicholls' romance of Charlotte Brontë
 Charlotte Brontë and Arthur Bell Nicholls' wedding trip and Irish Odyssey.

External links

 Website of the Brontë Society and Parsonage Museum in Haworth, Yorkshire
 Modern Day Images of Charlotte Brontë Residences (Archived)
 
 Charlotte's Web: A Hypertext on Charlotte Brontë's Jane Eyre (Archived)
  Rare Charlotte Bronte book coming home after museum's auction success
 Poems by Charlotte Brontё

Electronic editions
 
 
 
 
 

1816 births
1855 deaths
19th-century English novelists
19th-century English women writers
19th-century English writers
19th-century pseudonymous writers
Charlotte
Burials in West Yorkshire
Anglican writers
Christian novelists
Deaths from typhus
English Anglicans
English governesses
English people of Cornish descent
English people of Irish descent
English women novelists
English women poets
Infectious disease deaths in England
People from Thornton and Allerton
Pseudonymous women writers
Victorian novelists
Victorian women writers
Writers of Gothic fiction